Bridled Island is located approximately  off the coast from Onslow in the Pilbara region of Western Australia.

Description

The Bridled tern is known to inhabit the island with 3000-4000 pairs being estimated from a survey in 1996.

See also
 List of islands of Western Australia

References

Lowendal Islands